Oxford is a town in Worcester County, Massachusetts, United States. The population was 13,347 as of the 2020 United States Census.

History
Oxford was first settled in 1687 and was officially incorporated in 1713. It was the birthplace of Clara Barton, the first president and founder of the American Red Cross. Oxford was originally settled by Huguenots in two waves, the original settlement having been abandoned after four residents (John Johnson and his three children, Peter, Andrew and Mary) were killed in a violent confrontation with local Native Americans. This event, the Johnson Massacre, is commemorated near the south end of town on Main Street. The remains of the Huguenot Fort (built in 1686) still exist near Huguenot Road.

The first town clerk of Oxford was John Town, who also served as selectman and as a church deacon.

Geography
The town sits in a valley, and much of its area lies in the flood plain of the French River, which runs through the town. A substantial parcel north and west of Oxford Center is held, for flood control purposes, by the U.S. Army Corps of Engineers. The land, known as Greenbriar, also serves as a nature preserve.

It also serves to cut off east–west travel on former roads through the site. Route 20 runs east–west through North Oxford, running
north–south Route 12, locally called Main Street; less than a mile from Route 56, connecting North Oxford with points north; and Interstate 395, linking Oxford to Worcester and eastern Connecticut with three local exits: Depot Road in North Oxford; Sutton Avenue, the main east–west street in Oxford Center; and Cudworth Road, near the Webster town line.

The town used to include much of what is now Webster, on its southern border, but Oxford and neighboring Dudley both gave portions of their land to allow the creation of that town. Other towns bordering Oxford are Charlton to the west, Leicester and Auburn to the north, Millbury and Sutton to the east, and Douglas to the southeast.

Demographics

As of the 2000 census there were 13,352 people, 5,058 households, and 3,596 families residing in the town. The racial makeup of the town was 96.62% White, 0.87% Black or African American, 0.25% Native American, 0.84% Asian, 0.02% Pacific Islander, 0.32% from other races, and 1.07% from two or more races. Of the population, 1.97% were Hispanic or Latino of any race.

There were 5,058 households, out of which 34.6% had children under the age of 18 living with them, 56.0% were married couples living together, 11.6% had a female householder with no husband present, and 28.9% were non-families. Of all households, 23.6% were made up of individuals, and 8.6% had someone living alone who was 65 years of age or older. The average household size was 2.62 and the average family size was 3.12.

In the town, the population was spread out, with 26.1% under the age of 18, 7.5% from 18 to 24, 32.4% from 25 to 44, 22.8% from 45 to 64, and 11.2% who were 65 years of age or older. The median age was 37 years. For every 100 females, there were 93.5 males. For every 100 females age 18 and over, there were 89.6 males.

The median income for a household in the town was $52,233, and the median income for a family was $58,973. Males had a median income of $41,727 versus $30,828 for females. The per capita income for the town was $21,828. Of the population, 7.8% and 5.5% of families were below the poverty line. Of those, 12.5% under the age of 18 and 7.6% of those 65 and older were living below the poverty line.

The population was 13,709 at the 2010 census.

For geographic and demographic information on the census-designated place Oxford, please see the article Oxford (CDP), Massachusetts.

Local government

Library

The Oxford public library was established in 1869. In fiscal year 2008, the town of Oxford spent 1.5% ($468,609) of its budget on its public library—approximately $34 per person, per year ($41.64 adjusted for inflation to 2021).

Education

Oxford has a public school system with two elementary schools, one middle school, and one high school.

The first elementary school is the Alfred M. Chaffee School, which offers a pre-school, kindergarten, and first grade education. The second elementary school is the Clara Barton School, which offers 2nd–4th grade education. The Oxford Middle School offers 5th–7th grade courses, and Oxford High School offers grades 8th–12th.

Oxford High School has a number of sports activities throughout the fall, winter and spring seasons. Some of these sports include, field hockey, cross country, football, soccer, indoor track, basketball, outdoor track, baseball, softball, golf, and ultimate frisbee.

Points of interest

Bartlett's Bridge
Barton Center for Diabetes Education, site of the Clara Barton Camp for Diabetic Children and the Clara Barton National Historic Site
Hodges Village Dam
Hudson House
Huguenot Fort
Oxford High School
Oxford Public Library
North Oxford Mills

Notable people
 Agnes Ballard, educator, early woman architect and first woman elected to office in Florida was born here
 Clara Barton, teacher, nurse, humanitarian best remembered for organizing American Red Cross during the Civil War
 Carla Berube, college basketball player and coach
 Nelson H. Davis, brigadier general during American Civil War
 Tom Herrion, college basketball coach
 Elliott P. Joslin, doctor, pioneer in diabetes research
 Ebenezer Learned, general in American Revolution
 Tony Reno, college football coach
 Matthew Sands, educator
 Aron Stevens, wrestler and actor
 Elvira Stone, postmaster and genealogist

See also
 Oxford, Alabama
 Oxford, England
 Oxford, Maine

References

External links

 Town of Oxford official website

 
1686 establishments in Massachusetts
Towns in Massachusetts
Towns in Worcester County, Massachusetts
Populated places established in 1686